Maryland's 8th congressional district is concentrated solely in Montgomery County, comprising many economically and culturally diverse inner suburbs of Washington D.C. The district is currently represented by Democrat Jamie Raskin.

History

The district was created after the 1790 census in time for the 1792 election, was abolished after the 1830 census, and was reinstated after the 1960 census.

During redistricting after the 2000 census, the Democratic-dominated Maryland legislature sought to unseat then-incumbent Republican Connie Morella. One proposal went so far as to divide the district in two, effectively giving one to state Senator Christopher Van Hollen, Jr. and forcing then-incumbent Connie Morella to run against popular Maryland State Delegate and Kennedy political family member Mark Kennedy Shriver. Although it forced Van Hollen and Shriver to run against each other in an expensive primary, the shift still made the district even more Democratic than its predecessor, and Van Hollen defeated Morella in 2002.

From 2003 to 2013 the district mostly consisted of the larger part of Montgomery County, also including a small portion of Prince George's County. The district now includes most of Frederick County (but not the City of Frederick), southern Carroll County, and a swath of Montgomery County that narrows in the north and then widens in the south to encompass nearly all of the area "inside the beltway." The redrawn district is slightly less Democratic than its predecessor. While the Carroll and Frederick portions of the district tilt strongly Republican, the Montgomery County portion has twice as many people as the rest of the district combined, and Montgomery's Democratic tilt is enough to keep the district in the Democratic column. Since Morella left office, no Republican has crossed the 40 percent mark.

When Van Hollen left his seat in a successful bid to succeed Barbara Mikulski in the U.S. Senate, Jamie Raskin won the Democratic primary, all but assuring he would take over the seat in the general election. The primary campaign was the most expensive House race in 2016, due primarily to the large amounts spent by wealthy businessman and runner-up David Trone.

Following the 2020 redistricting cycle, starting in 2023, the 8th district will be contained entirely in Montgomery County. It will comprise all of Montgomery County's 1st, 4th, 6th, 7th, 8th, 10th, and 13th districts, and all of Montgomery County's 5th district excluding Fairland, Calverton, and Burtonsville, which will instead become part of the 4th congressional district. The redistricting makes the 8th district one of the most diverse in the country, where no racial group constituting over 40% of the population, with a population that is approximately 38% White, 22% Black, 21% Hispanic, and 18% Asian, with 38% of the population also being immigrants.

Voting

Recent elections

1960s

1970s

1980s

1990s

2000s

2010s

2020s

List of members representing the district

See also

Maryland's congressional districts
List of United States congressional districts

Notes

External links
 FairVote.org: Maryland's Redistricting News March 16, 2001 – October 18, 2001
 District boundaries, 1992–2002

Sources

 Archives of Maryland Historical List United States Representatives Maryland State Archives

 Congressional Biographical Directory of the United States 1774–present

08
Montgomery County, Maryland
Prince George's County, Maryland
1793 establishments in Maryland
Constituencies established in 1793